Flushing High School is a four-year public high school in Flushing, Michigan, U.S.A. It is operated by Flushing Community Schools.

Its sports teams are known as the Raiders. Colors: Orange and Black. The principal is Jason Melynchek. Its newspaper is titled The Blazer and its yearbook is titled Perannos.

History
On March 19, 1930, 125 students walked out of the high school to protest the school board's firing of superintendent Herbert V. Truemner. Truemner had been dismissed by the school board to take place at the end of the school year. The high school had 190 students at the time.

In 1998, the collapse of a cinder block wall in a new auditorium under construction at the school killed four construction workers.

In January of 2020, Flushing High School opened a brand new gymnasium and weight center, called the Raider Fieldhouse.

Feeder Schools

Middle schools 

 Flushing Middle School

Elementary schools 

 Elms Elementary
 Central Elementary
 Seymour Elementary
 Springview Elementary

Notable alumni
Ira Terry Sayre (1858–1926), Michigan state senator, graduated with one of the school's first classes in 1878

References

External links
Flushing. High School

Public high schools in Michigan
Schools in Genesee County, Michigan
Flushing, Michigan